Radiation Protection Dosimetry is a monthly peer-reviewed scientific journal covering radiobiology, especially dosimetry and radiation monitoring for both ionizing and non-ionizing radiation. The editor-in-chief is J. Hans Zoetelief (Delft University of Technology).

According to the Journal Citation Reports, the journal had a 2019 impact factor of 0.773.

References

External links 
 

Radiology and medical imaging journals
Oxford University Press academic journals
English-language journals
Monthly journals
Publications established in 1981